Soil and Water Bioengineering is a discipline of civil engineering. It pursues technological, ecological, economic as well as design goals and seeks to achieve these primarily by making use of living materials, i.e. seeds, plants, part of plants and plant communities, and employing them in near–natural constructions while exploiting the manifold abilities inherent in plants.
Soil bioengineering may sometimes be a substitute for classical engineering works; however, in most cases it is a meaningful and necessary method of complementing the latter.
Its application suggests itself in all fields of soil and hydraulic engineering, especially for slope and embankment stabilization and erosion control.

Soil bioengineering is the use of living plant materials to provide some engineering function. Soil bioengineering is an effective tool for treatment of a variety of unstable and / or eroding sites. Soil bioengineering techniques have been used for many centuries. More recently Schiechtl (1980) has encouraged the use of soil bioengineering with a variety of European examples. Soil bioengineering is now widely practiced throughout the world for the treatment of erosion and unstable slopes.

Fields of Application and Plants for Soil Bioengineering Control Works 
Soil Bioengineering methods can be applied wherever the plants which are used as living building materials are able to grow well and develop.
This is the case in tropical, subtropical and temperate zones whereas there are obvious limits in dry and cold regions, i.e. where arid, semi–arid and frost zones prevail. In exceptional cases, lack of water may be compensated for by watering or irrigation.
In Europe, dry conditions limiting application exist in the Mediterranean as well as in some inner alpine and eastern European snowy regions. However, limits are most frequently imposed in alpine and arctic regions. These can usually be clearly noticed by the limited growth of woody plants (forest, tree and shrub lines) and the upper limits of closed turf cover. The more impoverished a region is in species, the less suited it is for the application of bioengineering methods.

Functions and Effects of Soil Bioengineering Structures

Technical functions
protection of soil surface from erosion by wind, precipitation, frost and flowing water
protection from rock fall
elimination or binding of destructive mechanical forces
reduction of flow velocity along banks
surface and/or deep soil cohesion and stabilization
drainage
protection from wind
aiding the deposition of snow, drift sand and sediments
increasing soil roughness and thus preventing avalanche release

Apart from these, ecological functions are gaining in importance, particularly as these can be fulfilled to a very limited extent only by classical engineering constructions.

Ecological functions
improvement of water regime by improved soil interception and storage capability as well as water
consumption by plants
soil drainage
protection from wind
protection from ambient air pollution
mechanical soil amelioration by the roots of plants
balancing of temperature conditions in near–ground layers of air and in the soil
shading
improvement of nutrient content in the soil and thus of soil fertility on previously raw soils
balancing of snow deposits
noise protection
yield increase on neighbouring cropland

Landscaping functions
healing of wounds inflicted on the landscape by disasters and humans (exploitation of mineral resources, construction work, deposition of overburden, tunnel excavation material, industrial and domestic waste)
integration of structures into the landscape
concealment of offending structures
enrichment of the landscape by creating new features and structures, shapes and colours of vegetation

Economic effects

Bioengineering control works are not always necessarily cheaper in construction when compared to classical engineering structures. However, when taking into account their lifetime including their service and maintenance, they will normally turn out to be more economical. Their special advantages are:

lower construction costs compared to “hard” constructions
lower maintenance and rehabilitation costs
creation of useful green areas and woody plant populations on previously derelict land
Useful for income generation 
The result of soil bioengineering protection works are living systems which develop further and maintain their balance by natural succession (i.e. by dynamic self–control, without artificial input of energy). If the right living but also non–living building materials and the appropriate types of construction are chosen, exceptionally high sustainability requiring little maintenance effort can be achieved.

References

Soil science
Civil engineering
Forestry
Sustainable forest management
Forestry and the environment
Environmental soil science